Liam is a short form of the Irish name Uilliam or the old Germanic name William.

Etymology
The original name was a merging of two Old German elements: willa ("will" or "resolution"); and helma ("helmet"). The juxtaposition of these elements effectively means "helmet of will" or "guardian".

When the Frankish Empire was divided, the name developed differently in each region. In Northern Francia, Willahelm developed first into "Willelm" and then into "Willaume" in Norman and Picard, and "Guillaume" in Ile-de-France French. The Norman form was further developed by the English into the familiar modern form "William".

Origin
Although the names Willahelm and Guillaume were well known in England before 1066, through Saxon dealings with Guillaume, Duc de Normandie, it was viewed as a "foreign" name. The Norman Conquest had a dramatic effect on English names. Many if not most Saxon names, such as Ethelred, died out under the massive influx of French ones. Since the Royal Court now rang with names such as Alain, Guy, Reginald and William, they were quickly adopted by the English, the Welsh, and eventually the Irish.

Within a generation, the "new" names had become so completely assimilated that they were regarded as homegrown, and variant forms evolved and thrived alongside one another. In Wales, both William and Gwilym became popular, as did the short forms Wil and Gwil, and almost every village had its own Gwilym Williams (the final "s" represented "son of" or "descendant of"). The Norman conquest of Ireland followed a similar pattern to that of England a century earlier. Within a generation, the Irish Uilliam was found alongside William, and the short form of both was Liam.

Until the end of the 18th century, Liam was virtually unknown outside Ireland. In the mid-1850s, over a million and a half people left Ireland to escape the catastrophic great famine and, from then on, Irish names were heard everywhere. Liam as an independent name in England and Wales dates from 1932, but it was mainly confined to the families of Irish descent. By 1955, it was recorded for two boys in every 10,000, a figure it maintained until 1975, when it rose to four per 10,000.

Late 20th and early 21st centuries
By 1980, it was clear that Liam was becoming a vogue name in the general population in the United Kingdom and that year it was recorded for 12 boys per 10,000. It continued to gain ground. In 1985, it stood at 20 per 10,000, and by 1990, it was recorded for 100 boys in every 10,000. In 1996, Liam peaked in popularity as the 10th most popular baby name for boys in England and Wales, according to the UK Office for National Statistics.

Liam continued to remain in the top 33 most popular boys names in the UK throughout the first decade of the 21st century but started to steadily decline in 2009.

Meanwhile, according to the Social Security Administration, Liam had been steadily gaining in popularity in the United States and entered the top 50 names for the first time in 2009 at number 49. As Liam gained popularity in the US, climbing to number two by 2013, popularity in the UK plummeted, and it ranked 67th that same year. Liam was among the five most popular names for Hispanic newborn boys and newborn boys of Asian descent in the American state of Virginia in 2022. In Canada, Liam has been the most popular boys name since 2013.

People
Liam Abernethy, Irish hurler
Liam Aiken (born 1990), American actor
Liam Anthony, Australian rules footballer for North Melbourne
Liam Aylward, Irish politician
Liam Brady, footballer
Liam Byrne, British Labour Party politician
Liam Callanan, American author
Liam Clancy, Irish folk singer
Liam "Rory" Clewlow, lead guitar, backing vocals for Enter Shikari
Liam Cunningham (actor), Irish actor
Liam Cunningham (politician), Irish politician
Liam Darville, English footballer
Liam Davison, Australian author
Liam Eichenberg (born 1998), American football player
Liam Fahy, Zimbabwean shoe designer
Liam Finn, New Zealand musician and songwriter
Liam Foran, New Zealand rugby league player
Liam Fox, British politician
Liam Fulton, Australian rugby league player
Liam Gallagher, lead singer of the English rock bands Oasis and Beady Eye
Liam Garrigan, English actor
Liam Gill, Australian rugby union player
Liam Heath, British sprint kayaker
Liam Hemsworth, Australian actor
Liam Hendriks (born 1989), Australian baseball player
Liam Highfield, English professional snooker player
Liam Howlett, DJ and member of The Prodigy
Liam Irwin, Gaelic football player
Liam James, Canadian child actor
Liam Kelly (disambiguation)
Liam Lawrence, footballer
Liam Lawson, New Zealander racing driver
Liam Lynch (musician), American singer and dancer
Liam McCullough (born 1997), American football player
Liam McIntyre, Australian actor 
Liam McKenna, Irish television presenter
Liam Miller, footballer
Liam Neeson (born 1952), Irish actor
Liam O'Brien, American voice actor
Liam O'Flaherty, Irish writer
Liam O'Neill, Gaelic Athletic Association administrator
Liam Payne (born 1993), English singer and member of the British-Irish boy band One Direction
Liam Plunkett, English cricketer
Liam Ridgewell, footballer
Liam Stapleton, Australian radio presenter
Liam Waite, American actor
Liam Walsh (hurler) (born 1963), Irish hurler
Liam Walsh (boxer) (born 1986), English boxer
Liam Watson (disambiguation)
Liam Watts, drummer for the band the Enemy
Liam Watts, English rugby player in position of prop for Hull Kingston Rovers
Liam Weldon, Irish folk singer
Liam Williams (rugby player), Welsh rugby player
Liam Wilson, bass player for the Dillinger Escape Plan
Liam Wright, Papua New Guinean basketball player

References 

Masculine given names
English masculine given names
Irish masculine given names